"Tango" is a song by Italian singer-songwriter Tananai. It was written by Tananai, Paolo Antonacci, Alessandro Raina and Davide Simonetta, and produced by Tananai and Simonetta. 

It was released by Universal Music Group on 9 February 2023 as the first single from the re-iussue of Tananai's second album Rave, eclissi. The song was the artist's entry for the Sanremo Music Festival 2023, the 73rd edition of Italy's musical festival which doubles also as a selection of the act for the Eurovision Song Contest. He ended up at fifth in a field of 28.

Lyrics
The song was inspired by the real story of an Ukrainian family from Smoline forced to separate because of the 2022 Russian invasion, with the husband called to the front while the wife and their 14-years old daughter moved to Italy as refugees.

Music video
A music video for the song was directed by Olmo Parenti and features real images of the couple that inspired the song.

Charts

References

 

2023 songs
2023 singles
Sanremo Music Festival songs